Boroline is an over the counter antiseptic perfumed cream sold in India. It is manufactured by G D Pharmaceuticals.

History
The product was launched in 1929 in Kolkata by Gourmohan Dutta, a Bengali merchant. Over the years, the brand's popularity soared, and it became an icon of national economic self-sufficiency in a nation that was still under the British rule. It is still one of the most popular brands in India. Its logo has an elephant for which it is known as Hatiwala cream (the cream with elephant logo) in rural areas. The legacy music of Boroline’s jingle was composed by the V. Balsara, lyricist Pulak Bandopadhyay and Srabanti Majumdar.

Product
Boroline is a combination of the antiseptic boric acid, the astringent and sunscreen zinc oxide, and the emollient lanolin and is meant to be used for cuts, cracked lips, rough skin, and to treat infections.

Other products sold by the brand are: Raksha, Eleen, Suthol, Penorub and Noprix.

References

External links
 Boroline - Official website

Pharmaceutical companies established in 1929
Pharmaceutical companies of India
Antiseptics
Indian brands
Companies based in Kolkata
Indian companies established in 1929
Products introduced in 1929